Bike lanes (US) or cycle lanes (UK) are types of bikeways (cycleways) with lanes on the roadway for cyclists only. In the United Kingdom, an on-road cycle-lane can be firmly restricted to cycles (marked with a solid white line, entry by motor vehicles is prohibited) or advisory (marked with a broken white line, entry by motor vehicles is permitted). In the United States, a designated bicycle lane (1988 MUTCD) or class II bikeway (Caltrans) is always marked by a solid white stripe on the pavement and is for 'preferential use' by bicyclists. There is also a class III bicycle route, which has roadside signs suggesting a route for cyclists, and urging sharing the road. A class IV separated bike way (Caltrans) is a bike lane that is physically separate from motor traffic and restricted to bicyclists only.

Effects 

According to a 2019 study, cities with separated bike lanes had 44% fewer road fatalities and 50% fewer serious injuries from crashes. The relationship was particularly strong in cities where bike lanes were separated from car lanes with physical barriers. 

Research published in 2020 showed insights from communities where on-road cycling for transportation is less common, particularly in the Southeast U.S. and reported that potential bikers say separated bike lanes would make them more likely to participate in active transportation. However, scientific research indicates that different groups of cyclists show varying preferences of which aspects of cycling infrastructure are most relevant when choosing a specific cycling route over another; thus, in order to maximize utilization, these different groups of cyclists have to be taken into account.

A 2021 review of existing research found that closing car lanes and replacing them with bike lanes or pedestrian lanes had positive or non-significant economic effects on nearby businesses.

United States 

According to the National Association of City Transportation Officials (NACTO) bike lanes are an exclusive space for cyclists by using pavement markings and signage. Bike lanes flow in the same direction as motor vehicle traffic and is located adjacent to vehicle movement. Conventional bike lanes provide limited buffer space between vehicles cyclists, as those with protective space are referred to as buffered-bike lanes. Buffered bike lanes are similar to conventional lanes but provide a buffered space between vehicles and cyclists hence the name. The extra space can be between moving vehicles and/or parked vehicles and is typically 3-feet wide, the width of a car door. Contra-Flow Bike Lanes allow cyclists to travel in the opposite direction of vehicle traffic flow. Contra-Flow lanes are found on one-way streets that then allow two-way directional traffic for cyclists. Left-Side Bike Lanes are lanes placed on the left side of one-way streets, or along a median on two-way divided streets.

The Manual on Uniform Traffic Control Devices (MUTCD) by the U.S. Department of Transportation Federal Highway Administration (FHA) gives standards of how bike lanes should be implemented regarding pavement markings and signage. These can include the word, symbol, and arrow size to be used in a bike lane and the width of the lane itself, which ranges from 5–7 feet. Cities across America are actively expanding their amount of bike lanes, such as in Boston, Massachusetts where they have created city-wide goals, Go Boston 2030, to increase their bike network.

Europe 

In France, segregated cycling facilities on the carriageway are called bande cyclable, those beside the carriageway or totally independent ones piste cyclable, all together voie cyclable. In Belgium, traffic laws do not distinguish cycle lanes from cyclepaths. Cycle lanes are marked by two parallel broken white lines, and they are defined as being "not wide enough to allow use by motor vehicles". There is some confusion possible here: both in French (piste cyclable) and in Dutch (fietspad) the term for these lanes can also denote a segregated cycle track, marked by a road sign; the cycle lane is therefore often referred to as a "piste cyclable marquée" (in French) or a "gemarkeerd fietspad" (in Dutch), i.e. a cycle lane/track which is "marked" (i.e. identified by road markings) rather than one which is identified by a road sign. In the Netherlands the cycle lane is normally called "fietsstrook" instead of "fietspad".

Asia 

Commuting via bicycle is quite common in some Asian countries like Japan, in which bicycle ridership has been increasing dramatically since the 1970's. Despite this fact however, many parts of Japan have been slow to adopting effective and safe means of transport, so in recent times there have been steps taken to promote biking in the nation's largest city, Tokyo. Many bike lanes in Tokyo have been constructed to allow the 2 directional flow of traffic in only one lane but add a physical separation between pedestrians, bike lanes, and the roads. In addition to these types of bike lanes, there are other forms of bike lanes within various parts of the Tokyo wards that do not protect bicycle users from pedestrians but do from the road. These lanes are designated typically with signs overhead and some form of painted line to denote a lane for pedestrians and a lane for bikers, yet these rules are often not adhered to. In addition to these forms of bike lanes in Tokyo, there are several other types which mostly consist of some alteration of the aforementioned two, or are simply just painted lanes on the side of the road. In other parts of Japan, such as the city of Fukuoka, there are clear types of bike lanes being implemented in order to promote biking in the city: "Bicycle roads, Bicycle lanes, Sidewalks shared between pedestrians and cyclists with markings, and Sidewalks shared with pedestrian with no markings."

Other countries in Asia like China have larger networks of bike paths and lanes dedicated for cycling infrastructure. The city of Nanjing, China has several types of bike lanes: protected, unprotected, and shared lanes. These lanes are similar to that of other nations, in which the separated bike lanes are done either through physical barriers of some form or are entirely separate street paths. Unprotected bike lanes are painted on the street with vehicles but denote their own lane, and shared bike lanes are not denoted but implied that bikes shall share the entirety of the road with cars on that stretch of land. In addition, Chinese bike usage is relatively high compared to other nations, and as such, cycling is taken into account when designing interchanges on the road. As such, many interchanges include various paths for bicycle users to take so that they do not have to come into direct contact with motorized vehicles. Lastly, there has been increasing concern over the nature of biking accidents in China; a case study in Shanghai found that a desperate need for the shifting of bicycle lane type to protected from unprotected is the most needed change in particular.

See also

References

External links
Urban Bikeway Design Guide from National Association of City Transportation Officials

Cycling infrastructure
Transport infrastructure